Volodymyr Volodymyrovych Barilko (born 29 January 1994) is a Ukrainian retired professional football striker.

Career
Barilko is a product of the Metalist Kharkiv Youth School System. He is a younger brother of the Ukrainian footballer Serhiy Barylko.

He made his debut for FC Metalist in the match against FC Dynamo Kyiv on 1 March 2015 in the Ukrainian Premier League.

At the end of 2017 he announced about his retirement due to injury with no specification of which.

Personal life
His brother Serhiy Barilko is also a professional footballer.

References

External links

1994 births
Living people
Footballers from Kharkiv
Ukrainian footballers
Ukraine under-21 international footballers
Ukraine youth international footballers
FC Metalist Kharkiv players
Ukrainian Premier League players
FC Chornomorets Odesa players

Association football forwards